Agoniates is genus of characiform fishes from tropical South America.

Species
There are currently two recognized species in this genus:
 Agoniates anchovia C. H. Eigenmann, 1914
 Agoniates halecinus J. P. Müller & Troschel, 1845

References

Characiformes genera
Fish of South America
Tropical fish